Eri Yamaguchi (Kanji: , born 15 June 1992) is a Japanese woman cricketer. She made her international debut for Japan in the 2013 ICC Women's World Twenty20 Qualifier.

Eri was also the member of the Japanese cricket team at the 2014 Asian Games.

References

External links 
 
 Profile at CricHQ

1992 births
Living people
Japanese women cricketers
Cricketers at the 2014 Asian Games
Asian Games competitors for Japan
Doshisha University alumni
Sportspeople from Osaka Prefecture